Jayne Baxter (born 5 November 1955) is a Scottish Labour Party politician.  She was a Member of the Scottish Parliament (MSP) for the Mid Scotland and Fife region from 2012 to 2016. She succeeded John Park when he resigned his list seat to take up a position with the Community trades union.

A lifelong resident of Fife, she graduated from Edinburgh Napier University in 1995. She currently serves as constituency agent for Mid Scotland and Fife MSP Alex Rowley.

Baxter was Labour's second candidate on the Scotland constituency list in the 2019 European Parliament election.

References

External links 
 
Jayne Baxter profile at Scottish Labour website

1955 births
Place of birth missing (living people)
Living people
People from Fife
Alumni of Edinburgh Napier University
Councillors in Fife
Scottish Labour councillors
Labour MSPs
Members of the Scottish Parliament 2011–2016
Female members of the Scottish Parliament
Women councillors in Scotland